The 2015 Men's Pan-American Volleyball Cup was the tenth edition of the annual men's volleyball tournament. It was held in Reno, Nevada, United States from 12 to 17 August 2015 and played by eight countries.

Pools composition

Squads

Venue
Reno Events Center, Reno, Nevada

Pool standing procedure
 Numbers of matches won
 Match points
 Points ratio
 Sets ratio
 Result of the last match between the tied teams

Match won 3–0: 5 match points for the winner, 0 match points for the loser
Match won 3–1: 4 match points for the winner, 1 match point for the loser
Match won 3–2: 3 match points for the winner, 2 match points for the loser

Preliminary round
All times are Pacific Daylight Time (UTC−07:00).

Pool A

|}

Pool B

|}

Final round
All times are Pacific Daylight Time (UTC−07:00).

Championship bracket

5th–8th places bracket

Quarterfinals

Classification 5th–8th

Semifinals

7th place match

5th place match

3rd place match

Final

Final standing

Awards

Best players

Most Valuable Player
  Alan Souza
Best Scorer
  Luis David Adames
Best Spiker
  Stephen Maar
Best Blocker
  Flávio Gualberto
Best Server
  Casey Schouten
Best Setter
  Demián González
Best Receiver
  Rogério Carvalho Filho
Best Digger
  Facundo Santuacci
Best Libero
  Jesús Rangel

All–star team

Best Setter
  Demián González
Best Outside Spikers
  Stephen Maar
  Willner Rivas
Best Middle Blockers
  Flávio Gualberto
  Mario Frías
Best Opposite Spiker
   Casey Schouten
Best Libero
  Jesús Rangel

References

External links
Official website

Men's Pan-American Volleyball Cup
International volleyball competitions hosted by the United States
2015 in American sports
2015 in volleyball
2015 in sports in Nevada
Sports competitions in Reno, Nevada